"People of the Sky" is a song by the Canadian rock band Sloan. It was released in 1994 as the second single from the band's second studio album Twice Removed. The song is featured on the band's compilation album A Sides Win: Singles 1992-2005. It was the band's first song written by Andrew Scott to be released as a single.

Charts

Weekly charts

References

External links

People of the Sky
People of the Sky
1994 songs
Geffen Records singles